Maxim Davydov (born 23 October 1976) is a Russian orienteering competitor.

He won a silver medal at the World Games in 2005 in the mixed relay, with Sergey Detkov, Aliya Sitdikova and Tatiana Ryabkina.

References

1976 births
Living people
Russian orienteers
Male orienteers
Foot orienteers

World Games silver medalists
Competitors at the 2005 World Games
World Games medalists in orienteering